This is a list of all military equipment ever used by France. This includes everything from weapons to ships and aircraft.

Weapons 

 List of military weapons of France

Ships 

 List of French Navy ship names

Aircraft 

 List of military aircraft of France

References

equipment
France